William Payne-Gallwey  may refer to:
Sir William Payne-Gallwey, 1st Baronet (1759–1831), British soldier and governor of the Leeward Islands
Sir William Payne-Gallwey, 2nd Baronet (1807–1881), English Conservative Party member of parliament (MP) for Thirsk 1851-1880
William Payne-Gallwey (cricketer), Irish cricketer and British Army officer